Sabikhan is a Syrian town located in Mayadin District, Deir ez-Zor. According to the Syria Central Bureau of Statistics (CBS), Sabikhan had a population of 23,867 in the 2004 census.

References 

Populated places in Deir ez-Zor Governorate
Populated places on the Euphrates River